Abruzzo (Abbrìzze  or Abbrèzze), historically known as Abruzzi, is a region of Southern Italy with an area of 10,763 square km (4,156 sq mi) and a population of 1.3 million. It is divided into four provinces: L'Aquila, Teramo, Pescara, and Chieti. Abruzzo borders the region of Marche to the north, Lazio to the west and north-west, Molise to the south and the Adriatic Sea to the east. Geographically, Abruzzo is divided into a mountainous area in the west, which includes the highest massifs of the Apennines, such as the Gran Sasso d'Italia and the Maiella, and a coastal area in the east with beaches on the Adriatic Sea.

Abruzzo is considered a region of Southern Italy in terms of its culture, language, history, and economy, though in terms of physical geography it may also be considered part of Central Italy. The Italian Statistical Authority (ISTAT) also deems it to be part of Southern Italy, partly because of Abruzzo's historic association with the Kingdom of the Two Sicilies.

Almost half of the region's territory is protected through national parks and nature reserves, more than any administrative region on the continent, leading it to be dubbed "the greenest region in Europe." There are three national parks, one regional park, and 38 protected nature reserves. These ensure the survival of rare species, such as the golden eagle, the Abruzzo (or Abruzzese) chamois, the Apennine wolf and the Marsican brown bear. Abruzzo's parks and reserves host 75% of Europe's animal species. The region is also home to Calderone, one of Europe's southernmost glaciers.

Nineteenth-century Italian diplomat and journalist  (1853–1917) chose the adjectives forte e gentile ("strong and kind") to capture what he saw as the character of the region and its people. "Forte e gentile" has since become the motto of the region.

Provinces and politics

Provinces
Abruzzo is divided into four administrative provinces:

Politics

The Politics of Abruzzo takes place in a framework of a presidential representative democracy, whereby the President of Regional Government is the head of government, and of a pluriform multi-party system. Executive power is exercised by the Regional Government. Legislative power is vested in both the government and the Regional Council.

The Regional Government (Giunta Regionale) is presided by the President of the Region (Presidente della Regione), who is elected for a five-year term, and is composed by the President and the Ministers (Assessori), who are currently 8, including a Vice President (Vicepresidente) and an undersecretary (Sottosegretario).

History

Human settlements in Abruzzo have existed since at least the Neolithic times. A skeleton from Lama dei Peligni in the province of Chieti dates back to 6,540 BC under radiometric dating. The name Abruzzo appears to be derivative of the Latin word "Aprutium". In Roman times, the region was known as Picenum, Sabina et Samnium, Flaminia et Picenum, and Campania et Samnium. The region was known as Aprutium in the Middle Ages, arising from four possible sources: it is a combination of Praetutium, or rather of the name of the people Praetutii, applied to their chief city, Interamnia, the old Teramo.

Many cities in Abruzzo date back to ancient times. Corfinio was known as Corfinium when it was the chief city of the Paeligni, and later was renamed Pentima by the Romans. Chieti is built on the site of the ancient city of Teate, Atri was known as Adria. Teramo, known variously in ancient times as Interamnia and Teramne, has Roman ruins which attract tourists.

After the fall of the Roman Empire, a string of invasions and rulers dominated the region, including the Lombards, Byzantines, and Hungarians.  Between the 9th and 12th centuries, the region was dominated by the popes, and at times was part of the Duchy of Spoleto and (partly) the Duchy of Benevento. Subsequently, the Normans took over, and Abruzzo became part of the Kingdom of Sicily, later the Kingdom of Naples. The House of Bourbon-Two Sicilies took over in 1734, establishing the Kingdom of the Two Sicilies in 1816, and ruled until Italian unification (also known as the Risorgimento) in 1860.

The administrative region of Abruzzo was formed in the 1230s, when Frederick II divided his realms into giustizierato, with Abruzzo forming one of them. This was subsequently divided into Abruzzo Citra (nearer Abruzzo) and Abruzzo Ultra (farther Abruzzo), named in relation to the capital Naples, by Carlo I of Anjou in the 1270s, and in 1806 Abruzzo Ultra was itself divided in two (in the Kingdom of Naples (Napoleonic)), as Abruzzo Ultra I and Abruzzo Ultra II (being divided at the Gran Sasso d'Italia); the same Citra/Ultra I/Ultra II scheme was used for Calabria. When Abruzzo was divided into smaller regions, these were referred to collectively by the plural term Abruzzi. In the 1948 Italian Constitution, these were unified with Molise into the Abruzzi e Molise region, though in the first draft Abruzzo and Molise were separate, and in 1963 Abruzzi e Molise were separated into the two regions of Abruzzo and Molise. Abruzzo Citeriore is now the province of Chieti. The province of Teramo and province of Pescara now comprise what was Abruzzo Ulteriore I. Abruzzo Ulteriore II is now the province of L'Aquila.

During the Second World War, Abruzzo was on the Gustav Line, part of the German's Winter Line. One of the most brutal battles was the Battle of Ortona. Abruzzo was the location of two prisoner of war camps, Campo 21 in Chieti, and Campo 78 in Sulmona. The Sulmona camp also served as a POW camp in World War I; much of the facility is still intact and attracts tourists interested in military history.

Geography
Geographically, Abruzzo is nearly at the center of Italian peninsula, stretching from the heart of the Apennines to the Adriatic Sea, and includes mainly mountainous and wild land. The Adriatic coastline is characterized by long sandy beaches to the North and pebbly beaches to the South. Abruzzo is well known for its landscapes and natural environment, parks and nature reserves, characteristic hillside areas rich in vineyards and olive groves. Many beaches have been awarded the Blue Flag beach status.

Climate

In Abruzzo there are two climatic zones. The coastal strip and sub-Apennine hills have a climate markedly different from that of the mountainous interior. Coastal areas have a Mediterranean climate with hot dry summers and mild winters. Inland hilly areas have a sublittoral climate with temperatures decreasing progressively with increasing altitude. Precipitation is also strongly affected by the presence of the Apennines mountain range. Rainfall is abundant on slopes oriented to the west, and lower in east and east-facing slopes. The Adriatic coast is shielded from rainfall by the barrier effect created by the Apennines. Rainfall along the coast almost always never falls below . Pescara has relatively less rainfall (about ) than Chieti (about ). The highest rainfall occurs in upland areas on the border with Lazio; they are especially vulnerable to Atlantic disturbances. Around  of precipitation is typical.

Flora and fauna

The flora of Abruzzo is typically Mediterranean. Along the coastal belt Mediterranean shrubland Is the dominant natural vegetation, with species like  myrtle, heather and mastic. Inland we find olive, pine, willow, oak, poplar, alder, arbutus, broom, acacia, capers, rosemary, hawthorn, licorice and almond trees, interspersed with oak trees. At elevations between  there is sub-montane vegetation, with mixed woodlands of oak and turkey oak, maple and hornbeam; shrubs include dog rose and red juniper. In the Apennine Mountains at elevations above  species include alpine orchid, mountain juniper, silver fir, black cranberry and the Abruzzo edelweiss.

The fauna of Abruzzo is very diverse, including the region's symbol, the Abruzzo chamois (Rupicapra pyrenaica ornata), which has recovered from near-extinction. Common species include Marsican brown bear, Italian wolf, deer, lynx, roe deer, snow vole, fox, porcupine, wild cat, wild boar, badger, otter, and viper.

The natural parks of the region are the Abruzzo National Park, the Gran Sasso and Monti della Laga National Park, the Maiella National Park and the Sirente-Velino Regional Park, as well as many other natural reserves and protected areas.

In 2017, the ancient beech forests of the Abruzzo Lazio and Molise National Park of Europe were recognized as a World Heritage Site by UNESCO, with the region thus gaining its first prestigious site.

Economy

Until a few decades ago, Abruzzo was a backward region of Southern Italy. Since the 1950s, Abruzzo has showed steady economic growth. In 1951, per capita income or GDP was 53% of that of wealthier Northern Italy. The gap has since narrowed, being 65% in 1971 and 76% by 1994. The region reached the highest per capita GDP of Southern Italy through the highest growth rate of every other region of Italy. The unemployment rate stood at 9.3% in 2020.

Abruzzo is the 16th most productive region in the country, and is  the 13th for GRP per capita among Italian regions.

As of 2003, Abruzzo's per capita GDP was €19,506 or 84% of the national average of €23,181, compared to the average value for Southern Italy of €15,808. In 2006, the region's average GDP per capita was approximately 20,100 EUR. The construction of motorways from Rome to Teramo (A24) and Rome to Pescara (A25), which provided better access to the region, is credited as a driver of public and private investments.

The 2009 L'Aquila earthquake led to a sharp economic slowdown. However, according to statistics at the end of 2010, some signals of recovery were noted. Regional economic growth was recorded as 1.47%, which actually placed Abruzzo fourth among Italy's regions after Lazio, Lombardy and Calabria. In 2011 Abruzzo's economic growth was +2.3%, the highest percentage among the regions of Southern Italy.

Industry 

From the early 1950s to the mid-1990s Abruzzo's industrial sector expanded rapidly, especially in mechanical engineering, transportation equipment and telecommunications. The structure of production in the region reflects the transformation of the economy from agriculture to industry and services. The industrial sector relies on few large enterprises and the predominance of small and medium enterprises. In the applied research field, there are major institutes and enterprises involved  in the fields of pharmaceutics, biomedicine, electronics, aerospace and nuclear physics. The industrial infrastructure is dispersed throughout the region in industrial zones. The most important of these are: Val Pescara, Val di Sangro, Val Trigno, Val Vibrata and Conca del Fucino.

The province of Teramo is one of the most industrialized areas of Italy and of the region, with numerous small and medium-sized companies, then follows the province of Chieti and that of Pescara, which is also supported by tourism; the Val Vibrata (province of Teramo), on the border with the Marche region, is home to a myriad of small and medium-sized enterprises, especially in the textile and footwear sectors. The Val di Sangro (province of Chieti), on the other hand, is home to important multinationals and a factory belonging to the Fiat (Sevel) group. The area of Valle Peligna (province of L'Aquila) is also home to industries (the famous one of Sulmona sugared almonds), while other areas such as Pescara and Theatine are home to numerous industries, including multinationals (for example De Cecco, Procter & Gamble, Monti & Ambrosini Editori, Brioni, Ennedue and Miss Sixty, mostly concentrated in the industrial district of Val Pescara in the province of Chieti).

Agriculture

Agriculture, based  on small holdings, has  modernised and produces high-quality products. The mostly small-scale producers are active in wine, cereals, sugar beet, potatoes, olives, vegetables, fruit and dairy products. Traditional products are saffron and liquorice. By the late 20th and early 21st centuries, Montepulciano d'Abruzzo, the region's most famous wine, had become one of the most widely exported DOC-classed wines in Italy.

As for the figures, the region produces about 850,000 quintals of fruit, 5 million quintals of vegetables, 1,600,000 quintals of potatoes, 5,000,000 quintals of grapes produced, both for table and for the production of wine; the latter is estimated at
between 3 and 4 million hectoliters with the production of wines such as Montepulciano d'Abruzzo in the red and cerasuolo (rosé) varieties, Trebbiano d'Abruzzo, Pecorino and the Chardonnay; oil production, on the other hand, stands at 1,350,000 quintals of olives and 240,000 quintals of oil (Aprutino Pescarese, Pretuziano delle Colline Teramane and Colline Teatine), figures that put Abruzzo in sixth place among the Italian regions; as regards cereals, the durum wheat with over 1.5 million quintals constitutes the main cereal, followed by soft wheat (one million quintals), then barley (0.5 million quintals ); other crops are also grown such as beetroot (2,500,000 quintals), and tobacco (45,000 quintals).

Tourism

Tourism is an important economic sector; in the past decade, tourism has increased, mainly centered around its national parks and natural reserves, ski and beach resorts, in particular along the Trabocchi Coast. Abruzzo's castles and medieval towns, especially in the area of L'Aquila, have led to the creation of the nickname of "Abruzzoshire", along Tuscany's "Chiantishire." In spite of this, Abruzzo is still "off the beaten path" for most visitors to Italy.

Very popular with visitors from all over Italy and Europe the natural parks of the region such as the Abruzzo, Lazio and Molise National Park, the Gran Sasso e Monti della Laga National Park, the Maiella National Park and the Sirente-Velino Regional Park which every year attract thousands of visitors thanks to their nature unspoiled and rare wild fauna and flora species such as Abruzzo chamois moreover the region can boast many reserves, protected natural areas and lakes (Campotosto Lake and Lago di Scanno). 

In the inland mountain areas there are the ski resorts of Scanno, Ovindoli, Pescasseroli, Tagliacozzo, Roccaraso, Campo Imperatore, Campo Felice, Rivisondoli, Pescocostanzo, Prati di Tivo, San Giacomo (Valle Castellana), Passolanciano-Majelletta, Prato Selva, Campo Rotondo, Campo di Giove, Passo San Leonardo, Passo Godi, Pizzoferrato, and Gamberale, where winter tourism is highly developed and then you can play sports such as alpine skiing, snowboarding, ski mountaineering, ski touring, cross-country skiing and dog sledding.

Also of considerable importance is the summer coastal and seaside tourism, which sees the presence of numerous tourist bathing establishments equipped in various centers of the coast such as Pescara, Montesilvano, Pineto, Roseto degli Abruzzi , Giulianova, Alba Adriatica, Tortoreto, Ortona, Vasto, Martinsicuro, Silvi Marina and the Trabocchi Coast.

Finally, tourism for historical and cultural purposes is also important, concentrated above all in the cities of Chieti, Teramo, Vasto, Giulianova, Sulmona, and above all L'Aquila which can boast many monuments, museums, castles and churches (St. Gabriel's shrine and Santa Maria di Collemaggio) of national importance; also Pescara despite being a modern city, boasts monuments, churches and museums of historical importance such as the Birthplace of Gabriele D'Annunzio Museum. In the inland mountain areas there are ancient villages, castles, hermitages, sanctuaries abbeys, and ancient churches.

Demographics

Although the population density of Abruzzo has increased over recent decades, it is still well below the Italian national average: in 2008, 123.4 inhabitants per km2, compared to 198.8. In the provinces, the density varies:  Pescara is the most densely populated with 260.1 inhabitants per km2, whereas L'Aquila is the least densely populated with 61.3 inhabitants per km2, although it has the largest area. After decades of emigration from the region, the main feature of the 1980s is immigration from third world countries. The population increase is due to the positive net migration. Since 1991 more deaths than births were registered in Abruzzo (except for 1999, when their numbers were equal). In 2008, the Italian national institute of statistics ISTAT estimated that 59,749 foreign-born immigrants live in Abruzzo, equal to 4.5% of the total regional population.

The most serious demographic imbalance is between the mountainous areas of the interior and the coastal strip. The largest province, L'Aquila, is situated entirely in the interior and has the lowest population density. The movement of the population of Abruzzo from the mountains to the sea has led to the almost complete urbanization of the entire coastal strip especially in the province of Teramo and Chieti. The effects on the interior have been impoverishment and demographic aging, reflected by an activity rate in the province of L'Aquila which is the lowest among the provinces in Abruzzo – accompanied by geological degradation as a result of the absence of conservation measures. In the coastal strip, however, there is such a jumble of accommodations and activities that the environment has been negatively affected. The policy of providing incentives for development has resulted in the setting-up of industrial zones, some of which (Vasto, Avezzano, Carsoli, Gissi, Val Vibrata, Val di Sangro) have made genuine progress, while others (Val Pescara, L'Aquila) have run into trouble after their initial success. The zones of Sulmona and Guardiagrele have turned out to be more or less failures. Outside these zones, the main activities are agriculture and tourism.

Main settlements
L'Aquila is both the capital city of the Abruzzo region and of the Province of L'Aquila and second largest city (pop. 73,000). L'Aquila was hit by an earthquake on 6 April 2009, which destroyed much of the city centre. The other provincial capitals are Pescara, which is Abruzzo's largest city and major port (pop. 123,000); Teramo (pop. 55,000) and Chieti (pop. 55,000). Other large municipalities in Abruzzo include the industrial and high tech center Avezzano (pop. 41,000), as well as three important industrial and touristic centers such as Vasto (pop. 40,636), Lanciano (pop. 36,000), and Sulmona (pop. 25,000).

Transport

Airports 
Abruzzo International Airport is the only international airport in the region. Open to civilian traffic since 1996, the number of passengers has increased over the years because of low-cost air carriers' use of the facility. Today, the airport has a catchment area of over 500,000 passengers annually.
L'Aquila-Preturo Airport is located near L'Aquila, but remains underused.

Ports 

There are four main ports in Abruzzo: Pescara, Ortona, Vasto and Giulianova.

Over the years the Port of Pescara has become one of the most important tourist ports of Italy and the Adriatic Sea. Heavily damaged in World War II, it underwent major renovations for some sixty years. It now consists of a modern marina with advanced moorings and shipbuilding facilities. It has been awarded the European Union's blue flag for its services. The port of Pescara has lost passenger traffic because of its shallowness and silting, but its fishery and aquaculture activities are thriving.

Railways
There is a significant disparity between the railways of the Abruzzo coast and the inland areas, which badly need modernization to improve the service, in particular, the Rome-Pescara line.

Existing railway lines:

 Adriatic railway runs through the whole of Italy from north to south, along the Adriatic Sea.
 Rome – Sulmona – Pescara
 Sulmona – Carpinone
 Sulmona–Terni railway
 Avezzano railroad – Roccasecca
 Giulianova – Teramo
 Sangritana (Lanciano – Castel di Sangro)

Highways

There are three highways that serve the region:
 A24 (Rome – L'Aquila – Teramo) was built in the 1970s and connects Rome with the Adriatic coast in less than two hour-drive. The Gran Sasso tunnel, the longest road tunnel entirely on Italian territory, was opened in 1984.

 A25 (Torano – Avezzano – Pescara) connects Rome with Pescara. The road branches off A24 in Torano, spans across the Fucino basin, crosses the Apennines, and merges with A14 near Pescara.
 A14 Bologna – Taranto known as the "Adriatica", includes  of dual-carriage motorway between Bologna and Taranto.

Culture

The museum Museo Archeologico Nazionale d'Abruzzo in Chieti houses the famed statue Warrior of Capestrano  which was found in a necropolis of the 6th century B.C.  Across the region, among  the prominent cultural and historical buildings are: Teramo Cathedral, its archeological museum and the Roman theater, the Castello della Monica, the Collurania-Teramo Observatory, the famous L'Aquila Basilica of Santa Maria di Collemaggio (which holds the remains of Pope Celestine V), the Museo Nazionale d'Abruzzo, Santa Maria del Suffragio, the Forte Spagnolo, the Fountain of 99 Spouts, Gabriele D'Annunzio's house in Pescara, Campli's Scala Sancta and its church, the church of Santissima Annunziata in Sulmona, the cathedrals of Chieti, Lanciano, Guardiagrele, Atri and Pescara along with the castles of Ortona, Celano and Ortucchio.

Every year on 28–29 August, L'Aquila's Santa Maria di Collemaggio commemorates the Perdonanza Celestiniana, the indulgence issued by Pope Celestine V to anyone who, "truly repentant and confessed" would visit that Church from the Vespers of the vigil to the vespers of 29 August. Sulmona's Holy Week is commemorated with traditional celebrations and rituals, such as "La Madonna che scappa in piazza", when a large statue of the Mary, carried by a group of local fraternities, is carried across the square in procession. Cocullo, in the province of L'Aquila, holds the annual "Festa dei serpari" (festival of snake handlers) in which a statue of St. Dominic, covered with live snakes, is carried in a procession through the town; it attracts thousands of Italian and foreign visitors. In many Abruzzo villages, Anthony the Great's feast is celebrated in January with massive and scenic bonfires. 

In the past, the region of Abruzzo was well known for the transumanza, the seasonal movement of sheep floks: these used to travel mostly southbound towards the region of Puglia during the cold winter months. The Feast of St. Biagio, protector of wool dealers is celebrated across the region. On the third of February in Taranta Peligna every year since the sixteenth century an evocative ritual is held: panicelle, or small loaves made of flour and water, in the shape of a blessing hand, are distributed among the faithful.

Historical figures from the region include: the Roman orator Asinius Pollio; Latin poets Sallust and Ovid, who were born in L'Aquila and Sulmona respectively, Gaius Cassius Longinus, Roman senator and leading instigator of the plot to kill Julius Caesar. Pontius Pilate is said to have been native to the region. Abruzzo's religious personalities include Saint Berardo; John of Capistrano; Thomas of Celano, author of three hagiographies of Saint Francis of Assisi; and Alessandro Valignano, who introduced Catholicism to the Far East and Japan.  The Polish Pope John Paul II loved the mountains of Abruzzo, where he would retire often and pray in the church of San Pietro della Ienca. Local personalities in the humanities include: poet Ignazio Silone, movie director Ennio Flaiano who co-wrote La dolce vita, philosopher Benedetto Croce, poet Gabriele D'Annunzio, composer Paolo Tosti, sculptor Venanzo Crocetti.

American artists and celebrities such as: Dean Martin, Perry Como, Henry Mancini, Nancy Pelosi, Rocky Marciano, Rocky Mattioli, Bruno Sammartino, Mario Batali, John and Dan Fante, Tommy Lasorda, Dan Marino, Mario Lanza, Garry Marshall, Penny Marshall, and Al Martino trace part of their family roots to Abruzzo.

Some international movies shot in Abruzzo include The American, Jean-Jacques Annaud's The Name of the Rose, Fellini's La Strada and I Vitelloni, Schwarzenegger's Red Sonja, Ladyhawke, King David, Francesco, Keoma, The Barbarians, The Fox and the Child and Krull.

Medieval and Renaissance hill towns

Before the 2009 earthquake, Abruzzo was the region with the highest number of castles and hill towns in Italy. It still holds many of Italy's best-preserved medieval and Renaissance hill towns, twenty-three of which are among The Most Beautiful Villages in Italy. This listing recognises their scenic beauty, arts and culture, their historical importance and quality of life.

The abrupt decline of Abruzzo's agricultural economy in the early to mid-20th-century spared some of the region's historic hill towns from modern development. Many lie entirely within regional and national parks. Among the most well preserved are Castel del Monte and Santo Stefano di Sessanio, within  the Gran Sasso National Park on the edge of the high plain of Campo Imperatore and nestled beneath the Apennines' highest peaks. Both hill towns, which were ruled by the Medicis for over a century-and-a-half, see relatively little tourism. Between the two towns sits Rocca Calascio, the ruin of an ancient fortress popular with filmmakers. Both Monteferrante and Roccascalegna are two of the most representative Abruzzo villages in the province of Chieti. Within the Gran Sasso National Park is also found Castelli, an ancient pottery center whose artisans produced ceramics for most of the royal houses of Europe.

Civitella del Tronto played a crucial role in the history of the unification of Italy. The fortress of Civitella is the most visited monument in the Abruzzo region today. Other medieval hill towns located within Abruzzo's park system are Pacentro in the Maiella National Park and Pescasseroli in the Abruzzo National Park. Pacentro, which features a 14th-century castle with two intact towers, has been little touched by modernisation. The Shrine of Gabriel of Our Lady of Sorrows, in the province of Teramo, which attracts some two million visitors per year, is one of the 15 most-visited sanctuaries in the world. Capestrano, a small town in the province of L'Aquila, is the hometown of Saint John of Capistrano, Franciscan friar and Catholic priest, as well as the namesake of the Franciscan missions San Juan Capistrano in Southern California, the mission Mission San Juan Capistrano in Texas and the city of San Juan Capistrano in Orange County, California. Giulianova is a notable example of a Renaissance "ideal city."

The proximity to Rome, the protected areas and scenic landscapes making the region one of the greenest in Europe, the presence of quaint villages, its rich and varied culinary traditions are important tourist attractions. In 2010, visitors included 6,381,067 Italians and 925,884 foreign tourists.

In 2015, the American organization Live and Invest Overseas included Abruzzo on its list of World's Top 21 Overseas Retirement Havens. The study was based on such factors as climate, infrastructure, health care, safety, taxes, cost of living and more. In 2017 the Chamber of Commerce of Pescara presented Abruzzo region to the Annual conference of Live and Invest Overseas in the U.S. city of Orlando, Florida. One year later, in October 2018, Live and Invest Overseas held its first conference in Abruzzo.

Universities 

There are three universities in the Abruzzo region:
 University of L'Aquila
 D'Annunzio University of Chieti–Pescara
 University of Teramo

Harvard University bases an intensive summer Italian language and culture program in Vasto, a resort town on Abruzzo's southern coast.

Science

Between the province of Teramo and L'Aquila, under the Gran Sasso Tunnel, is the Laboratori Nazionali del Gran Sasso (LNGS) of the INFN, one of the three underground astroparticle laboratories in Europe.

The Istituto Zooprofilattico Sperimentale dell'Abruzzo e del Molise "Giuseppe Caporale", which conducts research in veterinary and environmental public health, is located in Teramo.

The Gran Sasso Science Institute, located in L'Aquila, is an advanced research institute which offers doctorates in astroparticle physics, computer science, and mathematics as well as urban studies and regional science, and which also conducts scientific research.

Sports

Interamnia World Cup, the largest international youth handball competition worldwide, takes place yearly in Teramo.

There are several football clubs in Abruzzo.  Delfino Pescara 1936 is a Serie C club; based in Pescara, its home stadium is Stadio Adriatico – Giovanni Cornacchia.

Dialects
The regional dialects of Abruzzo include Teramano, Abruzzese Orientale Adriatico and Abruzzese Occidentale. The first two forms are a dialect of the Southern Italian language also known simply as Neapolitan since the region has been part of the Kingdom of Naples and the Kingdom of the Two Sicilies, while Aquilano is related to the Central Italian dialects including Romanesco.
The dialects spoken in the Abruzzo region can be divided into three main groups:
 Sabine dialect, in the province of L'Aquila, a central Italian dialect
 Abruzzo Adriatic dialect, in the province of Teramo, Pescara and Chieti, that is virtually abandoned in the province of Ascoli Piceno, a southern Italian dialect
 Abruzzo western dialect, in the province of L'Aquila, a southern Italian dialect

Cuisine

Abruzzo's cuisine is renowned for its variety and richness. Both the agricultural and coastal areas of Abruzzo have contributed to its cuisine. Due to the mountains, much of Abruzzo was relatively isolated until the 20th century. This has contributed to preservIng local culinary traditions.

Ingredients

In terms of common ingredients, cuisine in Abruzzo often includes:
 Lamb and mutton, primarily in the mountains. Sheep's milk (or ricotta) is an important source of Abruzzese cheese, and lamb intestines are used as sausage casing or for stuffed meat rolls. Mountain goat meat is also common in Abruzzo.
 Truffles and mushrooms, particularly wild mushrooms from the forests and hills 
 Garlic, especially red garlic
 Rosemary
 Hot chili pepper or peperoncini, regionally known as diavolilli or diavoletti, is common in Abruzzese cuisine and often used to add spice to dishes. Abruzzo residents are well known for frequently adding peperoncini, or hot peppers, to their meals. 
 Vegetables such as lentils, grasspeas and other legumes, artichoke, eggplant, and cauliflower

Starter dishes
 Spaghetti alla chitarra which is made by pressing or cutting pasta through a chitarra, an implement to form long thin noodles similar to spaghetti. The pasta is served with a tomato-based sauce, often flavored with peppers, pork, goose, or lamb. This dish is complemented by regional side dishes, such as the bean and noodle soup, sagne e fagioli. This soup is traditionally flavored with tomatoes, garlic, oil, and peperoncini.
 , flavored with bacon, eggs and pecorino cheese
Scrippelle, a rustic French-style crêpe served either  (a type of soup) or used to form a sort of soufflé with some ragù and stuffed with chicken liver, meatballs, hard-boiled eggs, and cheese
 Pastuccia, a polenta stew with sausage, eggs, and cheese

Meat
Across the region, roast lamb is enjoyed in several variations. Some of these variations include:
 Arrosticini, a skewered lamb dish
 Pecora al cotturo, lamb stuffed with a variety of mountain herbs and cooked in a copper pot
 Lamb cooked whole in a bread oven
 Agnello cacio e ovo, a lamb-based fricassee
 Mazzarella: lamb intestines stuffed with lamb, garlic, marjoram, lettuce, and spices
 Le virtù: a soup from Teramo filled with legumes, vegetables and pork, made only on 1 May.
Timballo abruzzese: lasagna-like dish with pasta sheets (scrippelle) layered with meat, vegetables and rice; often served for Christmas and Easter
 Porchetta abruzzese: moist boneless-pork roast, slow-roasted with rosemary, garlic, and pepper

Seafood
Seafood is also popular, especially in coastal areas. The variety of fish available locally resulted in several fish-based Brodetti (broths), coming from such places as Vasto, Giulianova, and Pescara. These broths are often made by cooking fish, flavored with tomatoes, herbs, and peperoncino, in an earthenware pot. Other fish products are Scapece alla vastese, Baccalà all'abruzzese, and Coregone di Campotosto, typical lake fish.

Pizzas
Rustic pizzas are also very common. Some of these are:

 Easter Pizza, a rustic cake with cheese and pepper from the Teramo area
 Fiadoni from Chieti, a dough of eggs and cheese well risen, cooked in the oven in a thin casing of pastry
 A rustic tart pastry filled with everything imaginable: eggs, fresh cheeses, ricotta, vegetables, and all sorts of flavorings and spices.

Also from Teramo are the spreadable sausages flavored with nutmeg, and liver sausages tasting of garlic and spices. Atri and Rivisondoli are famous for cheeses. Mozzarella, either fresh or seasoned, is made from ewe's milk, although a great number of lesser known varieties of these cheeses can be found all over Abruzzo and Molise.

Salumi
Salumi (singular salume) is an Italian term describing the preparation of cured meat products made predominantly from pork.

Spreadable sausage flavored with nutmeg and liver sausage with garlic and spices are hallmarks of Teramo cuisine. Ventricina from the Vasto area is made with large pieces of fat and lean pork, pressed and seasoned with powdered sweet peppers and fennel and encased in dried pig stomach. Mortadella di Campotosto (well known in Abruzzo) is an oval, dark-red mortadella with a white column of fat. They are generally sold in pairs, tied together. Another name for the mortadella is coglioni di mulo (donkey's balls). It is made from shoulder and loin meat, prosciutto trimmings and fat. It is 80 percent lean meat; 25 percent is prosciutto (ham), and 20 percent is pancetta. The meat is minced and mixed with salt, pepper and white wine.

Cheeses
The region's principal cheeses are:
 White cow cheese, a soft cheese made from cow's milk
 Caciocavallo abruzzese, a soft, slightly elastic dairy product made from raw, whole cow's milk with rennet and salt
 Caciofiore Aquilano, made from raw whole sheep's milk, rennet, artichokes and saffron (which gives it its characteristic yellow color)
 Caciotta vaccination frentana, a half-cooked, semi-hard cheese made from raw whole cow's milk, rennet and salt
 Canestrato of Castel del Monte, a hard cheese made from raw whole sheep's milk, with rennet and salt

 Caprino abruzzese, made from raw whole goat milk (sometimes with sheep's milk), curd, and salt
 Cheese and curd stazzo, cheese and byproducts obtained from the processing of raw milk from sheep, cattle and goats
 Junket vaccination or Abruzzo sprisciocca, a soft fresh cheese made from raw whole cow's milk, rennet, and salt
 Pecorino d'Abruzzo: one of Abruzzo's flagship products—a mild, semi-hard (or hard) cheese with holes, made from raw whole sheep's milk, rennet, and salt
 Pecorino di Atri, a compact, semi-cooked cheese made from sheep's milk, rennet and salt
 Pecorino di Farindola, cheese made from sheep's milk and pork rennet (a special type of rennet, made by filling a dried pork stomach with vinegar and white wine for forty days)
 Ricotta, made from the remnants of the coagulation of raw whole sheep's milk, heated after filtration
 Scamorza d'Abruzzo, a stretched curd cheese made from cow's milk, rennet (liquid or powder) and salt

Atri and Rivisondoli are known for their cheeses. Mozzarella (fresh or seasoned) is typically made from ewe's milk; many lesser-known cheeses are found throughout Abruzzo and Molise.

Desserts and sweets

Abruzzo's sweets are well-known:
 Dragée (also known as confetti): sugar-coated almonds from Sulmona
 Torrone Nurzia: chocolate nougat from L'Aquila
 Parrozzo: a cake-like treat made from crushed almonds and coated in chocolate
 Pizzelle (also known as ferratelle): a waffle cookie, often flavored with anise
 Croccante, a type of nougat made from almonds and caramelized sugar, often flavored with lemon
 Calgionetti, cagionetti, caggiunitti, caviciunette: Christmas fritters, sometimes filled with chestnuts or chickpeas and flavored with chocolate or cocoa
 Bocconotti: stuffed sweets often served for Christmas
 Zeppole di San Giuseppe: fried or baked pastries made for Saint Joseph's Day
 , two layers of sponge cake filled with custard, produced in the town of Guardiagrele in the province of Chieti

Fruits
The region's principal fruits are:
 : coastal citrus (particularly oranges), used for jam and limoncello
  and : types of chestnut
 : a local cherry
 : almonds from the town of Navelli
 : apples from the region
 : table grapes, also used for jam

Olive oil
 

The use of oil in regional mountain and sea dishes is important; among the most common oil products we find the Aprutino Pescarese, the Pretuziano delle Colline Teramane, l'Olio extra vergine di oliva delle Valli Aquilane and Colline Teatine.

The list of Abruzzo olive cultivars:

 Castiglionese
 Dritta 
 Gentile di Chieti
 Intosso
 Monicella
 Carpinetana
 Morella 
 Nebbio di Chieti
 Raja 
 Toccolana
 Tortiglione
 Crognalegna
 Gentile del L'Aquila (Rusticana del L'Aquila)

The extra-virgin olive oil produced in Colline Teramane (Teramo hills) is marked by the DOP.

The region has several cultivars that includes Carboncella, Dritta (Dritta Francavillese and Dritta di Moscufo), Gentile del Chieti, Nostrana (Nostrana di Brisighella), and Sargano olive cultivars.

Wines and liquors

Renowned wines like Montepulciano DOCG, Trebbiano d'Abruzzo DOC and Controguerra DOC are judged to be amongst the world's finest. In 2012, a bottle of Trebbiano d'Abruzzo ranked No. 1 in the top 50 Italian wine awards. 

In recent decades these wines have been joined, particularly, by wines from lesser known (heritage) white grapes, such as, Pecorino, Cococciola, Passerina, Montonico Bianco and Fiano.

IGT wines are Alto Tirino, Colli Aprutini, Colli del Sangro, Colline Frentane, Colline Pescaresi, Colline Teatine, Del Vastese (or Histonium), Terre di Chieti, and Valle Peligna. The region is also well known for the production of liqueurs such as Centerbe, Limoncello, Ratafia and Genziana.

Gallery

See also 
List of museums in Abruzzo
2009 L'Aquila earthquake

References

External links 

Official site of the regional administration
Official Abruzzo tourist board website
Travel Guide to Abruzzo: all you need to know to plan your visit
Map of Abruzzo
In the land of bears and castles, Financial Times, 29 June 2007
Italy as it used to be The Guardian, 16 April 2005
Life in Abruzzo, a chronicle of Abruzzo life written from a hill village in the Gran Sasso Mountains
Things to do in Abruzzo

 
Regions of Italy
NUTS 2 statistical regions of the European Union
States and territories established in 1963
Wine regions of Italy
Samnium
Picenum